The Central District of Faryab County is a district (bakhsh) in Faryab County, Kerman Province, Iran. At the 2006 census, its population was 31,605, in 6,751 families.  The district has one city: Faryab.  The district has three rural districts (dehestan): Golashkerd Rural District, Hur Rural District, and Mehruiyeh Rural District.

References 

Faryab County
Districts of Kerman Province